The 2020 Toronto International Film Festival, the 45th event in the Toronto International Film Festival series, was held from September 10 to 21, 2020. Due to the COVID-19 pandemic in Toronto, the festival took place primarily on an online streaming platform, although limited in-person screenings still took place within the constraints of social distancing restrictions.

Officially the festival concluded on September 19, with the final film premieres and events taking place that day; however, due to the 48-hour rental period applying to film viewings on the online platform, the festival platform remained open until September 21 to honour tickets purchased on closing day.

Planning
The festival's executive director Joana Vicente and artistic director Cameron Bailey spoke about the festival's plans in a video conference call launching the international We Are One: A Global Film Festival; Bailey also discussed some of the festival's plans in an interview on IndieWire's "Screen Talk" podcast. Plans included efforts to act as a "united platform" to screen films that had been slated to premiere at other cancelled festivals such as the 2020 Cannes Film Festival, and efforts to capitalize on the resurgence of drive-in theaters by staging some live screenings at drive-in venues. In a joint statement with the Venice Film Festival, the Telluride Film Festival and the New York Film Festival, which along with TIFF are generally considered the "big four" autumn film festivals that often compete with each other to land major film premieres in a normal year, the organizers of all four festivals committed to a spirit of collaboration and unity, designed "to serve the filmmakers, audiences, journalists and industry members who keep the film ecosystem thriving."

On June 24, organizers indicated that a smaller program of 50 films would be screened in a conventional manner, using social distancing strategies such as drive-in or outdoor screenings, over the first five days of the festival, and would then remain available on a dedicated streaming platform for the remainder of the festival. The digital platform was launched in July 2020 as the Digital TIFF Bell Lightbox, with a curated selection of past TIFF films available for short-term digital rental in the weeks leading up to the festival. The digital platform included both a professional option for international critics and industry, and a public option available only to Canadian viewers; ticket prices were the same regardless of whether the viewer was attending a physical screening or watching the film online. The industry platform also included an additional program of 30 films not part of the official public program, designed to act as a film market due to the pandemic-associated shutdown of international travel.

Venues for the festival included the TIFF Bell Lightbox, with social distancing strategies in place, as well as two outdoor screens at Ontario Place and one at Polson Pier. The Isabel Bader Theatre was initially announced as one of the screening venues, but was removed from the event calendar due to social distancing restrictions remaining in place at the University of Toronto. Initially, organizers announced that in-person film screenings would be "masks optional", but were criticized for creating a potential superspreader event as the social nature of the festival could increase the risk for COVID-19 transmission. The festival reversed the decision within 24 hours, citing a surge of new cases in Ontario, and made masks mandatory at the physical screenings.

With a smaller than normal program, both festival programmers and critics noted that films which have a tendency to be overlooked at a normal TIFF, such as documentaries and titles by emerging film directors in the Discovery program, could potentially have a better chance than usual of standing out and gaining attention.

In 2021, Bailey and Vicente indicated that although the 2020 festival saw reduced ticket sales compared to 2019, it was simultaneously the most successful event in the festival's entire history in terms of business activity and sales to film distributors.

Ambassadors
Due to the unprecedented nature of the 2020 festival, and the fact that celebrities and filmmakers were largely not able to attend the festival in person, the festival announced a roster of 50 "TIFF Ambassadors", actors and filmmakers who helped to promote the festival through interactive digital experiences and events.

Awards

TIFF Tribute Awards
The festival presented the TIFF Tribute Awards, which were introduced in 2019 to honour actors and filmmakers for distinguished achievements over the course of their careers. Honorees in 2020 included Anthony Hopkins, Chloe Zhao, Mira Nair and Kate Winslet. For the first time, the ceremony was broadcast live by CTV Television Network, and was hosted by Tyrone Edwards and Chloe Wilde of CTV's eTalk.

Regular awards
Award winners were announced on September 20. The People's Choice Awards were still presented in all three categories; due to the reduced number of films in the Documentary and Midnight Madness streams, only winners were named for those awards rather than runners-up, although first and second runners-up were still named for the main People's Choice award. However, some of the juried awards were suspended, or presented in a different form than usual; notably, the Platform Prize was not presented as no films were named to the Platform program, and the award for Best Canadian First Feature Film was not presented due to the limited number of eligible films. Canadian singer-songwriter Shawn Mendes, in association with TIFF, announced the creation of the Shawn Mendes Foundation Changemaker Award, which awards filmmakers who create films with a social message.

Films
American Utopia by Spike Lee was announced as the festival's opening film. The festival also screened Chloé Zhao's film Nomadland, as part of a special arrangement which saw the film open at TIFF, NYFF and Venice all on the same day.

The first batch of films slated for the festival was announced on June 24, 2020, and more were announced on July 30. The final announcement of short films and special events took place on August 25.

Gala presentations

Special presentations

Contemporary World Cinema

Masters

TIFF Docs

Discovery

Short Cuts

Midnight Madness

Planet Africa

Primetime

Wavelengths

Special Events

Industry Selects
The Industry Selects program was a film market for films seeking commercial distribution. Due to the pandemic, which prevented members of the North American film industry from travelling to international film festivals where many of the following films were screened, they were available on the festival's industry platform, but not on the commercial platform for the general public.

Canada's Top Ten
TIFF's annual Canada's Top Ten list, its national critics and festival programmers poll of the ten best feature and short films of the year, was released on December 9, 2020.

Feature films
Beans — Tracey Deer
Fauna — Nicolás Pereda
Funny Boy — Deepa Mehta
Inconvenient Indian — Michelle Latimer
Judy Versus Capitalism — Mike Hoolboom
The Kid Detective — Evan Morgan
Nadia, Butterfly — Pascal Plante
The Nest — Sean Durkin
No Ordinary Man — Chase Joynt, Aisling Chin-Yee
Possessor — Brandon Cronenberg

Short films
Aniksha — Vincent Toi
The Archivists — Igor Drljaca
Benjamin, Benny, Ben — Paul Shkordoff
Black Bodies — Kelly Fyffe-Marshall
êmîcêtôcêt: Many Bloodlines — Theola Ross
Foam (Écume) — Omar Elhamy
How to Be At Home — Andrea Dorfman
Scars — Alex Anna
Sing Me a Lullaby — Tiffany Hsiung
Stump the Guesser — Guy Maddin, Evan Johnson, Galen Johnson

References

External links
 
 2020 Toronto International Film Festival at IMDb

2020
Toronto
2020 in Toronto
2020 in Canadian cinema
Toronto